"Man Size Love" is a song written by Rod Temperton.  The song was recorded by Klymaxx, and by Temperton, along with Dick Rudolph and Bruce Swedien.

Background
This synth-heavy song lyrics tell how a woman wants a real man to satisfy her.
"Man Size Love" was recorded for the MCA label and was released as the first single from Klymaxx's self-titled fifth album.  The song also appears in the 1986 film Running Scared as well as being included on the Running Scared soundtrack album.

Cover versions
"Man Size Love" reached #15 on the Billboard Hot 100, #43 on the publication's R&B chart. On the dance chart it peaked at #18, helping the Klymaxx LP reach gold status.

Credits
Lead vocals: Lorena Porter
Background vocals: Klymaxx

References

1986 singles
Klymaxx songs
Songs written by Rod Temperton
1986 songs
MCA Records singles